As railroads around the world haul larger quantities of freight efficiently, the title of world's most powerful locomotive has often been passed to new generations of rolling stock.

Standard
There are many ways in which a locomotive can be the largest: the heaviest, longest, most cylinders, most power, or most wheels. It is often defined as the longest in length, but there is even a debate on whether or not to include the tender, which is equivalent to the fuel tank of a diesel, in the measurement. To establish the "largest" category, several factors take precedence: overall weight, which gives traction over driving axles; size (length & height of engine itself); and power, which may be in terms of raw horsepower, tractive effort, available power at axles (shaft horsepower) or, in the case of steam locomotives, available steam on a sustained basis.

List

See also
List of largest passenger vehicles

References

External links
 Steamlocomotive.com article regarding the largest steam locomotives archive at the Internet Archive Wayback Machine

largest locomotives
Locomotives, Largest
locomotives
Largest things by volume